John Farey Jr. (20 March 1791 – 17 July 1851) was an English mechanical engineering, consulting engineer and patent agent, known for his pioneering contributions in the field of mechanical engineering.

As consulting engineer Farey worked for many well-known inventors of the later Industrial Revolution, and was a witness to a number of parliamentary enquiries, inquests and court cases, and on occasion acted as an arbitrator. He was polymathic in his interests and contributed text and drawings to a number of periodicals and encyclopaedias.

Farey is also remembered as the first English inventor of the ellipsograph, an instrument used by draughtsmen to inscribe ellipses.

Biography

Youth and education 
Farey was the eldest son of John Farey Sr. (1766–1826), the geologist, and Sophia Hubert (1770–1830). He was the older brother of Joseph Farey (1796–1829), who also became a known mechanical engineer and draughtsman and member of the Institution of Civil Engineers in 1822. He remained in the shadow of his older brother and died young.

From 1791 to 1802 he grew up in Woburn, Bedfordshire, where his father was stationed as surveyor and land agent for Francis Russell, 5th Duke of Bedford. Back in London he might have received training at the school of William Nicholson, established in 1799 in London's Soho Square. He did later on work together with Nicholson on patent assignments. From 1804 to 1806 he studied the machinery and processes in manufacturing factories in and around London.

Early career 

At the age of fourteen Farey was commenced to make drawings for the illustrative plates of Rees's Cyclopædia and the 'Edinburgh' encyclopedias, 'Tilloch's Magazine,' Gregory's 'Mechanics' and 'Mechanical Dictionary,' the 'Pantalogia,' and many other scientific works. He edited some of these, and contributed to others.

For the Rees's Cyclopædia, which appeared serially between 1802 and 1820, Farey wrote several articles, including the articles on Machinery, Manufactures, Mechanics, Mill, Steam Engine, Water etc.

He came into the possession of the manuscript and drawings of the engineer John Smeaton and made extensive use of them in his writing and drawing. He was involved in the production of the second volume of Smeaton's Reports (1812), the plates engraved by Wilson Lowry.

In 1819 he went to Russia for a month, where be was engaged as a civil engineer in the construction of ironworks.

Later career 

In 

1821 Farey stepped down in the consulting engineering family business in favour of his younger brother, Joseph Farey (1796–1829). Farey accepted an appointment at the lace manufactory of John Heathcoat in Devonshire, which, however, he gave up in 1823,

In 1825 took the engineering direction of Messrs. Marshall's flax-mills at Leeds; this position he was obliged to relinquish in 1826 in consequence of the failure of his brother's health and the necessity for his return to London, where he resumed his profession of consulting engineer, and from that time was engaged in most of the novel inventions, important trials in litigated patent cases, and scientific investigations of the period.

Farey joined the Institution of Civil Engineers as a member in 1826, served several offices in the council, and always took great interest in its welfare. His residence, 67 Great Guilford Street, Russell Square, London, was burnt down in 1850, when considerable portions of his library and documents were injured or destroyed.

His health, which had been failing since the death of his wife, now received an additional shock, and he died of disease of the heart at the Common, Sevenoaks, Kent, on 17 July 1851. and was buried on the western side of Highgate Cemetery (plot no.3864). The grave, which is behind that of John Harrison in the dissenters section, no longer has a decipherable inscription.

Work

Instruments for drawing 

The necessity of accomplishing drawings with accuracy in a limited time led Farey to invent in 1807 an instrument for making perspective drawings, for which he received a silver medal from the Society of Arts in 1814. In an accompanying letter printed in the Transactions, Farey explained in general:

An additional four page long explanation of Farey's "Instrument for drawing Lines to an inaccessible center" in Plate 2 (see image fig. 4, 5.) started explaining:

In 1813 Farey also constructed a machine for drawing ellipses, the so-called ellipsograph. The device became so popular, that the 6th edition of the Encyclopædia Britannica (1824) included an article about it, which started with:
 

The drawing device was described in many other publications in his days, for example in Smith's The Mechanic; Or, Compendium of Practical Inventions, 1825 (see image), and it was described in the Edinburgh Encyclopædia (1832) along with four other devices by Farey. For this invention the gold medal of the same society was awarded hun.

Steam-engine indicator and indicator-diagram 
At the construction of ironworks in Russia since 1819 he first saw a steam-engine indicator; on his return to England he employed McNaught to make indicators for general use, and thenceforth he was continually requested to use the instrument in disputed cases of the power of steam-engines.

A Treatise on the Steam Engine, 1827 

Farey wrote the two-volume work A Treatise on the Steam Engine, which has been described as the finest work on technology published in the Industrial Revolution.

The first volume covered the early developments of steam pumps, atmospheric engines and low pressure steam engines through the eighteenth century. In particular, the work of Savery, Newcomen, Smeaton and Watt. It was published in 1827. Rekers & Koetsier (2007) commented on this work:

{{Blockquote|Of Farey’s work, only the first of two volumes was published at the time, which dealt mostly with the history of steam engines up to the death of James Watt. Farey described all sorts of engines, but gave special attention to those designed by Smeaton. Besides this, the volume also included sections on the principles of mechanics and the design of engines, avoiding mathematical formulas as most engineers at the time would not have been able to understand them, according to Farey...<ref>Rekers, W., and T. Koetsier. "On the Teaching of Mechanical Engineering in The Netherlands in the early nineteenth century: The work of GJ Verdam (1802–1866)." in: 12th IFToMM World Congress, Besanc¸on, June 18–21, 2007.</ref>}}

The second volume covered the development of high-pressure steam and the simple expansion steam engine from 1800, by Trevithick and Woolf. This volume was never published; at the time of Farey's death it had been typeset, but not sold. 
The book was never sold as the sheets were pulped. It was reprinted in facsimile since from the author's proof, with hand-written corrections by the author, that is now in the National Reference Library of Science and Invention.

 Selected publications  
 Farey, John. A treatise on the steam engine : historical, practical, and descriptive. 1827

Articles, a selection
 Farey, John. Contributions to Rees's Cyclopædia, etc., 1808–1818
 Farey, John. "Force of Steam," in: Transactions of the Institution of Civil Engineers, (1836), i. p. 85-94, p. 111-16.

Articles about 
 Charles Mamby (ed.). "John Farey," obituary in: Minutes of Proceedings of the Institution of Civil Engineers, Institution of Civil Engineers (Great Britain), 1852. p. 100-102
 Alec Skempton. "Farey, Jr., John," in: A Biographical Dictionary of Civil Engineers in Great Britain and Ireland: 1500–1830. 2002. p. 223-224
 Woolrich, A. P., "John Farey and the Smeaton Manuscripts", History of Technology vol 10, 1985, pp. 181–216
 Woolrich, A. P., "John Farey, Jr., technical author and draughtsman: his contribution to Rees's Cyclopadia". Industrial Archaeology Review, 20, (1998), 49-68
 Woolrich, A. P., "John Farey and his Treatise on the Steam Engine of 1827", History of Technology'', vol 22, 2000, pp. 63–106

In 1831, Farey gave evidence to a Parliamentary select committee on steam carriages, which is included in the committee's report, published in 1834.

See also
Aerial Steam Carriage
John Hick - awarded a silver medal by the Society of Arts for his invention of an elliptograph in 1840.

References

Attribution

External links 

 John Farey at gracesguide.co.uk

1791 births
1851 deaths
English engineers
Burials at Highgate Cemetery
People from Lambeth